Nikephoros II or Nicephorus II (died 25 July 1261) was a Byzantine cleric and Patriarch of Constantinople in exile at the Empire of Nicaea.

Originally serving as Metropolitan of Ephesus, he was elected to the patriarchate after the resignation of Arsenios Autoreianos in 1260. He died after a few months, in early 1261, and was buried at Nymphaion. A period of vacancy followed his death, but after the reconquest of Constantinople in July, Arsenios was recalled from his retirement and restored to the patriarchal throne.

Sources
 Brief biography at the website of the Ecumenical Patriarchate

1261 deaths
13th-century patriarchs of Constantinople
Bishops of Ephesus
People of the Empire of Nicaea
Year of birth unknown